The angular incisure (or angular notch) is a small notch on the stomach. It is located on the lesser curvature of the stomach near the pyloric end. Its location varies depending on how distended the stomach is.

The angular incisure is used as a separation point between the right and left portions of the stomach, the body and the pylorus. An imaginary line drawn perpendicular to the lesser curvature of the stomach through the angular incisure makes up the boundary between the body of the stomach and pylorus.

References

Digestive system